James W. Caldwell (born January 28, 1943) is an American former basketball player. He attended Lawrenceburg high school in Indiana before playing college basketball for the Georgia Institute of Technology.

Caldwell was selected by the Los Angeles Lakers in the third round (28th pick overall) of the 1965 NBA Draft. He played for the New York Knicks (1967–68) in the NBA for two games and for the New Jersey Americans (1967–68) and Kentucky Colonels (1967–68, 1968–69) in the ABA for 135 games.

References

External links

1943 births
Living people
American men's basketball players
Basketball players from North Carolina
Centers (basketball)
Georgia Tech Yellow Jackets men's basketball players
Kentucky Colonels players
Los Angeles Lakers draft picks
New Jersey Americans players
New York Knicks players
Sportspeople from Durham, North Carolina
Wilmington Blue Bombers players